= Encyclopedia of Major Marketing Strategies =

Economics book

Encyclopedia of Major Marketing Strategies (formerly Encyclopedia of Major Marketing Campaigns) is a multi-volume reference work that describes and analyzes major marketing campaigns, published by Gale.

Volumes:

- I (1999)
- II (2007)
- III (2013)
- IV (2019)
